The Cheshire Association Football League is a football competition based in Cheshire, England, which until 2007 was known as the Mid-Cheshire Association Football League. From season 2017–18, the league operates four divisions: the Premier Division, Divisions One and Two, and a Reserve Division. Founded in 1948, only one club (Knutsford) have maintained continuous membership since the formation of the league. Two other founder members have only recently left the league – Whitchurch Alport in 2012 and Barnton in the summer of 2014 .

The Premier Division sits at step 7 of the National League Pyramid, level 11 in the English Football Pyramid'.

2022–23 members
Source:

Premier Division
AFC Knowsley
Altrincham Reserves
Broadheath Central 
Congleton Town Reserves
Crewe
Daten 
Eagle Sports
Egerton
Garswood United
GPSO
Lostock Gralam
Middlewich Town
Poynton
Whaley Bridge Athletic
Whalley Range
Winnington Avenue 94
Winstanley Warriors

League One
Avon Villa
Billinge
Blacon Youth
Cheadle Heath Nomads Reserves
Denton Town
Golborne Sports
Knutsford
Maine Road Reserves
Malpas
Newton Athletic
Parklands
Sandbach United Reserves
Styal
Vulcan
Wythenshawe Amateurs Reserves

League Two
Ashton Town Reserves
Atherton Laburnum Rovers U23s
Bollington Town
FC St. Helens Reserves
Hartford
Haydock FC
Holmes Chapel
Lymm Rovers FC
Mersey Valley FC
Moore United
Newton-Le-Willows
Pilkington U23
St Michaels DH
Stretford Paddock
Upton JFC
West Didsbury & Chorlton Reserves (Hyde United)

Previous Divisional Champions(The league ran only a single division from 1983 to 1987)''

References

External links

Official website
FA Full-time Cheshire Football League

 
Football in Cheshire
1948 establishments in England
Football leagues in England
Sports leagues established in 1948